Thannhausen is a municipality in the district of Weiz in the Austrian state of Styria. It is where Princess Sophie of Hohenberg died in 1990.

References

Cities and towns in Weiz District